Tom Wheeler is an American television and film writer and producer. He served as the executive producer and show runner for the NBC superhero series The Cape.

Career

Television work 
Wheeler began his television career writing and executive producing the ABC mini-series Empire in 2005. He then wrote two television pilots, The World According to Barnes and Captain Cook's Extraordinary Atlas, neither of which were taken to series. His series The Cape, about a police officer framed for a crime he did not commit who takes on the guise of his son's favorite comic book hero in order to clear his name, premiered on NBC on January 9, 2011.

Film work 
Wheeler co-wrote the screenplay for Puss in Boots (2011), a spin-off from the Shrek franchise about the eponymous character.

He is currently writing the screenplay for the 2015 DreamWorks Animation's animated film B.O.O.: Bureau of Otherworldly Operations. But that film was quietly canceled. He was also co-writing another DWA's animated film Trollhunters together with film's co-director Guillermo del Toro, But the movie was then converted into a television series instead. Wheeler also wrote the 2017 live-action/animated film, The Lego Ninjago Movie.

Other writing 
As of 2018, Wheeler is working with Frank Miller on a project called Cursed, which is an illustrated YA book reimagining the King Arthur legend from the point of view of the Lady of the Lake. Wheeler will write the prose, while Miller will provide original full-color and black-and-white illustrations. Miller and Wheeler will also simultaneously adapt the book into a TV series, which has already received a 10-episode order from Netflix. They will also both be executive producers on the project.

Filmography

Film

Television

References

External links 

American television writers
American male television writers
American television producers
Living people
Place of birth missing (living people)
Year of birth missing (living people)